The Márquez Province is a province of Boyacá Department, Colombia. The province is formed by 10 municipalities.

Municipalities 
Boyacá • Ciénaga • Jenesano • Nuevo Colón • Ramiriquí • Rondón • Tibaná • Turmequé • Úmbita • Viracachá

References

External links 
 Boyaca Info; Provinces of Boyaca

Provinces of Boyacá Department